"Prime Time TV" is a song by Polish singer Basia released in 1986 as her debut solo single. It was included on her first album Time and Tide in 1987. The track was written by Basia, Danny White, and Peter Ross of Immaculate Fools, and produced by Danny and Basia.

Music videos
The first music video for the song was filmed in 1987. It pictures Basia dancing and singing the song surrounded by suspended TV screens, with her face projected on them.

The second clip was filmed in March 1989 by Crescenzo Notarile and is a performance music video. It pictures Basia performing the song accompanied by full band and backup singers, with flickering TV screens in the background. This version was included on the VHS/LaserDisc release A New Day in 1990.

Track listings
7" single
A. "Prime Time TV" – 3:27
B. "Freeze Thaw" (Instrumental) – 3:57

12" single
A. "Prime Time TV" (Extended Remix) – 5:39
B1. "Freeze Thaw" (Instrumental) – 3:57
B2. "Prime Time TV" – 3:27

CD single
 "Prime Time T.V." – 3:28
 "Freeze Thaw" (Instrumental) – 3:57
 "Prime Time T.V." (Extended Mix) – 5:38

Charts

References

External links
 The official Basia website

1986 singles
1986 songs
Basia songs
Epic Records singles
Songs written by Danny White (musician)
Songs written by Basia
Songs about television
1986 debut singles